Melbourne's tram classification system is based on classes originally devised by the Melbourne & Metropolitan Tramways Board (M&MTB). At first this was largely based on the order in which the original tramway operators had introduced each different type of tramcar between 1906 and 1920.

The classification system was simplified in 1928 (or possibly earlier). All the drop-end combination trams of the B, H, J, M, and S classes were added to A class. The straight sill combination classes F, K, Q, and R, were added to G class. Drop-end-and-centre Maximum traction bogie combination classes D, E, N, and P, were added to C class. Sometimes variations on a design were given extra letters or numerals. For example, W type trams classified as W3, CW5, or SW6. Over the years many of the trams were modified and then reclassified – for example, every one of the original 200 W class trams were converted to W2 class between 1928 and 1933.

Individual tram fleets had been numbered (from 1 upwards) by each of the pre-M&MTB tramway operators, but by 1924 the M&MTB had consolidated the numbering across the combined fleet. With the introduction of Z class trams, the M&MTB started a new numbering system. Tramways in Ballarat, Bendigo,  Geelong, Sorrento and the Victorian Railways had their own tram numbering systems. Trams which were moved between the systems were renumbered.

There were also many non-passenger trams, such as rail grinders, breakdown cars and freight cars which were not included in the classification system.

Classes

References

Taxi in Melbourne

Trams in Melbourne
Tram vehicles of Australia